Kelarabad Rural District is a rural district (dehestan) in Kelarabad District, Abbasabad County, Mazandaran Province, Iran. At the 2006 census, its population was 8,445, in 2,394 families. The rural district has 18 villages.

References 

Rural Districts of Mazandaran Province
Abbasabad County